Alan Charles Parker  (born November 1946) is a British businessman, chairman of Mothercare, and former CEO of Whitbread.

Early life
He earned a bachelor's degree from the University of Surrey.

Career
Parker was CEO of Whitbread from June 2004 until he retired on his 64th birthday, in November 2010.

He has been non-executive chairman of Mothercare since August 2011.

Parker is a visiting professor at the University of Surrey.

References

Living people
1946 births
Alumni of the University of Surrey
British chief executives
British hospitality businesspeople
Chief executives in the hospitality industry
Commanders of the Order of the British Empire
Whitbread people